The  is Japan's national open golf championship. Founded in 1927, it is one of the oldest professional golf tournaments in Japan.

The Japan Open is one of the three richest tournaments on the Japan Golf Tour, with a prize fund of ¥210 million in 2022. Between 1992 and 2021 it was the tour's designated "Flagship event" for the purposes of the Official World Golf Ranking, with a minimum winner's points allocation of 32 points. 

The winner also receives an invitation to the following year's Open Championship.

Winners

Future venues 
2023：Ibaraki Country Club (West Course), Ibaraki City, Osaka
2024：Tokyo Golf Club, Sayama City, Saitama
2025：Nikko Country Club, Nikko City, Tochigi
2026：Tarao Country Club (West Course), Kouga City, Shiga
2027：Boso Country Club Boso Golf Course (East Course), Mutsuzawa Town, Chosei District, Chiba Prifecture

References

External links
Official site 
Coverage on the Japan Golf Tour's official site

Golf tournaments in Japan
Japan Golf Tour events
Recurring sporting events established in 1927
1927 establishments in Japan